NK Sloga is a Croatian football club based in the town of Nova Gradiška in Slavonia.

Football clubs in Croatia
Football clubs in Brod-Posavina County
1910 establishments in Croatia